The Capital Press Club was founded in 1944 as an African-American alternative to the US National Press Club, which did not then accept black members.

Past presidents include Wallace Terry (1962-1965).

References

External links
 capitalpressclub.org
 Capital Press Club Records Finding Aid 

American press clubs
1944 establishments in Washington, D.C.
Organizations based in Washington, D.C.
African-American organizations

African-American press